Georgia State Route 5 Spur may refer to:

 Georgia State Route 5 Spur (Canton): a former spur route of State Route 5 that partially existed in Canton
 Georgia State Route 5 Spur (Ellijay): a former spur route of State Route 5 that existed in Ellijay
 Georgia State Route 5 Spur (Marietta 1972–1983): a former spur route of State Route 5 that existed in Marietta
 Georgia State Route 5 Spur (Marietta): a spur route of State Route 5 that exists in Marietta

005 Spur